The 1975 Pacific hurricane season officially started May 15, 1975, in the eastern Pacific, and June 1, 1975, in the central Pacific, and lasted until November 30, 1975. These dates conventionally delimit the period of each year when most tropical cyclones form in the northeast Pacific Ocean.

The 1975 Pacific hurricane season was slightly above average, with 17 tropical storms forming. Of these, 9 became hurricanes, and 4 became major hurricanes by reaching Category 3 or higher on the Saffir-Simpson Hurricane Scale. The only notable storms are Hurricane Olivia, which killed 30 people, caused $30 million (1975 USD) in damage, and left thousands homeless when it made landfall in October; and an unnamed hurricane that developed at very high latitude, but had no effect on land. Hurricane Denise was the strongest storm of the year. Hurricanes Lily and Katrina passed close to Socorro Island and Tropical Storm Eleanor made landfall in Mexico. Hurricane Agatha sank a ship.



Season summary 

The season began with the formation of Tropical Depression One on June 2 and ended with the extratropical transition of Tropical Storm Priscilla on November 7. No named systems formed in May, two in June, four in July, six in August, three in September, one in October, and one in November. The total length of the season, from the formation of the first depression to the dissipation of the last, was 158 days.

In the eastern Pacific proper (east of 140°W), sixteen tropical storms and eight hurricanes formed. Four of the hurricanes became major hurricanes by reaching Category 3 or higher on the Saffir-Simpson Hurricane Scale. These numbers are close to the long-term averages of fifteen tropical storms, nine hurricanes, and four major hurricanes. There were also four unnamed tropical depressions. The only system to enter or form in the central Pacific (between 140°W and the international dateline) was an unusual high-latitude hurricane.

The only systems to make landfall this year were Tropical Storm Eleanor and Hurricane Olivia. Besides these two systems, Hurricane Agatha caused the sinking of a ship carrying millions of dollars worth of cargo. Tropical Storm Eleanor caused no serious impact.

The most devastating storm of the season was Hurricane Olivia. A late-season major hurricane, Olivia came ashore near Mazatlán. The storm killed 30 people, left around 30,000 people homeless, and caused 20 million dollars (1975 USD) in damage.

Systems

Hurricane Agatha 

It organized into a tropical depression the next day. After heading southwestward, it turned to the northwest and strengthened into Tropical Storm Agatha on June 2. Agatha maintained its course and steadily intensified. Hurricane Agatha started weakening thereafter, becoming a tropical storm on June 4 and a depression on June 5. It dissipated shortly afterwards.

Even though Agatha passed close to Mexico as it weakened, no impact is known to have been caused. Waves caused by Agatha did impact a ship called the Polynesian Diakan. A Greek freighter en route from Pago Pago to Terminal Island, California, the Polynesian Diakan began flooding on June 3, forcing the 32-man crew to abandon the vessel. The exact cause of the initial flooding was unknown, but was speculated to be primarily due to cargo shifting and not the weather. The crew was rescued by the United States Coast Guard. Three members required hospitalization. After being reached on June 6 by a tugboat in a salvage attempt, the vessel capsized and sank near San Clemente Island on June 7, taking its multimillion-dollar cargo of 71 containers of canned tuna with it. The reason for the sinking was unknown.

Tropical Storm Bridget 

The depression moved generally westward, and intensified into Tropical Storm Bridget on June 28. It started accelerating as it turned towards the northwest, then west, and eventually to the southwest. Bridget weakened into a tropical depression on July 2 and dissipated the next day. It remnant circulation hung about in the area for a few more days. Bridget never came near land and thus, no deaths or damage were recorded.

Hurricane Carlotta 

It headed generally west-northwest and steadily intensified, becoming a tropical storm later on July 2. It became a hurricane on July 3 and ultimately peaked as a Category 3 hurricane. Hurricane Carlotta was first major hurricane, Category 3 or higher, of the season. It began weakening thereafter, and was a tropical storm by July 8. Carlotta became a depression on July 10 and dissipated the next day. The hurricane did not come near land and caused no significant impact.

Hurricane Denise 

An unstable area developed a circulation and became a tropical depression on July 4. It headed west- northwest and became a tropical storm on July 7. The next day, it was a hurricane and turned to the west. Continuing to strengthen, it reached Category 4 intensity on July 9. This windspeed was the highest of the season. The hurricane turned to the southwest and gradually weakened. By July 11 it was nearly stationary. It then headed northwestward again and continued weakening, becoming a tropical storm on July 13. It weakened into a depression on July 14 and dissipated immediately thereafter. Denise brought winds of near-gale force to parts of Mexico, but otherwise caused no damage or casualties.

Tropical Storm Eleanor 

As its center of circulation became more pronounced and it was upgraded into Tropical Storm Eleanor. The tropical storm moved northwestward, and later curved northward. The system made landfall near Manzanillo on July 12. It quickly dissipated. Eleanor brought  winds the Manzanillo, but damage from the storm is minor due to the lack of heavy rains.

Tropical Storm Francene 

A rapidly moving squally area of disturbed weather that was moving on a northwestward path was upgraded into Tropical Depression Seven on July 27. It intensified into a tropical storm later that day. Francene turned to the west and weakened into a tropical depression on July 28. It slowly weakened and ceased to exist as a tropical cyclone on July 30. Francene's remnants persisted as a tropical disturbance for another twelve hours, before completely dissipating. This tropical cyclone caused no known impact.

Tropical Storm Georgette 

It was upgraded to tropical storm intensity the next day. After heading generally westward and peaking as a weak to moderate tropical storm on August 12, Georgette slowly weakened. It weakened into a depression on August 14 and underwent extratropical transition thereafter. The cyclone dissipated twelve hours later. Tropical Storm Georgette had no impact on land.

Tropical Storm Hilary 

A tropical disturbance formed on August 11 and gradually organized. The next day, an atmospheric circulation developed. Based on this, this system was classified as Tropical Depression Nine on August 13. The depression quickly intensified into a tropical storm and was named Hilary. The system gradually accelerated to the northwest and reached its peak strength on August 15 with winds of 60 mph (95 km/h). Tropical Storm Hilary then started a gradual weakening trend. It became a depression on August 16, turned a little bit more westward, and dissipated on August 17. Hilary never came near land, and as such caused no death or damage.

Hurricane Ilsa 

On August 18, a tropical depression formed south of the Gulf of Tehuantepec from a tropical wave that had entered the Pacific Ocean from the Atlantic Ocean. It strengthened into a tropical storm later that day. The tropical storm moved westward, and became a hurricane on August 21. Ilsa became a Category 2 hurricane on August 22. It maintained that intensity for three days as it moved out to sea. On August 25, Ilsa turned westward and rapidly weakened. It fell to tropical storm intensity on August 26. Later that day, while still maintaining winds of gale-force, Ilsa ceased being a tropical cyclone. Ilsa's remnants continued out over the open Pacific Ocean. The remains of Ilsa eventually interacted with another weather system. That triggered the development of the unnamed hurricane of August 31–September 5.

Hurricane Ilsa caused no casualties or damage. As the unnamed hurricane formed from Ilsa's remnants, Ilsa and the latter system are unofficially the same tropical cyclone. Indeed, this year's seasonal report from the Redwood City Eastern Pacific Hurricane Center, in the Monthly Weather Review includes a brief discussion of the unnamed hurricane in the report's section on Hurricane Ilsa. Neither the Central Pacific Hurricane Center nor the official HURDAT "best track" database of tropical cyclone location and intensity data explicitly considers them the same. Hence, as far as official records matter, Ilsa and the unnamed hurricane of August 31 – September 5 are different tropical cyclones.

Hurricane Jewel 

It intensified into Tropical Storm Jewel the next day. The tropical cyclone headed generally northwest and paralleled the coast of Mexico. On August 27, Jewel became a hurricane for mere six hours, the minimum possible time in HURDAT. Jewel then turned to the west, and then back to the northwest. Jewel weakened to depression strength on August 31. Tropical Depression Jewel dissipated shortly after that, although its remnants remained distinct until September 3. There was no impact.

Hurricane Katrina 

On August 29, an area of weather developed directly into a tropical storm, skipping the tropical depression stage. Katrina steadily intensified as it headed west-northwest, gradually turning to the northwest. Katrina then headed westward and rapidly weakened. It was downgraded into a tropical storm on September 5 and a depression on September 6. The last advisory was issued on September 7 when Katrina dissipated. Although the hurricane brought Category 3-equivalent winds to Socorro Island on September 2, no damage was reported there or anywhere else.

Hurricane Twelve 

A cold core low absorbed the remnant circulation of Hurricane Ilsa on August 31. Convection subsequently increased. By September 3 it was definitely a tropical cyclone as an eye slowly formed. It then became a hurricane. The hurricane rapidly headed towards the northeast and approached a frontal cyclone. By September 5 the hurricane had transitioned into an extratropical cyclone after weakening to a tropical storm. The extratropical low moved southeastward, retaining its identity until it reached Montana, where it was absorbed by a front.

It is unknown why this hurricane went unnamed, even though it clearly met the criteria for doing so. Any statement about why is purely speculative at this point. The hurricane is the furthest north a tropical cyclone existed in the Eastern Pacific, and is also the northernmost existence for a Pacific hurricane. It was the only tropical cyclone to exist in the central Pacific this year. No damage or casualties were reported, although it did hassle a few ships.

Hurricane Lily 

Rain and wind reports from the Acapulco weather station suggested that a tropical depression was developing. This was confirmed on September 16 from ship reports. It intensified into a tropical storm and was named Lily. Tropical Storm Lily headed northwest in a nearly straight path. After passing southwest of Socorro Island, Lily weakened, becoming a storm on September 20. Lily weakened into a depression on September 21, turned to the west-southwest, and dissipated. Its remnants remained visible until September 24, when they were no longer distinct via weather satellite. On September 19, the cyclone brought hurricane-force winds to Socorro Island. No damage or casualties were reported.

Tropical Storm Monica 

In late September, three tropical disturbances moved westward across the eastern Pacific Ocean. One of them organized into a tropical depression on September 28. The next day the depression was upgraded to Tropical Storm Monica. The tropical storm initially headed west-northwestward and gradually curved towards the north. It reached its peak intensity of 50 mph (85 km/h) on September 29. Monica then gradually weakened. It became a tropical depression on October 1. The cyclone dissipated shortly thereafter. No impact was reported in association with Tropical Storm Monica.

Tropical Storm Nanette 

On September 28, a system developed into a tropical depression, simultaneously with Tropical Storm Monica.. It headed generally westward and on September 29, 18 hours after Monica did it, strengthened into a tropical storm. Nanette continued out to sea and slowly strengthened. It peaked in windspeed of 50 mph (85 km/h) on October 3 and turned to the southwest. It then slowly weakened. On October 4, it weakened into a tropical depression and then degenerated into a disturbance that same day. No damage or deaths were reported.

Hurricane Olivia 

On October 22, Tropical Depression Eighteen formed from a cluster of three thunderstorms south of Mexico and then strengthened into a tropical storm. It moved northwestward initially, followed by a northeast turn. Olivia then intensified steadily. It reached Category 3 intensity and a peak of 115 mph (185 km/h) winds just before landfall. Early on October 25, Olivia moved ashore just south of Mazatlán causing major damage. Olivia destroyed 7,000 houses in the region, leaving 30,000 people homeless, and damage totaled $20 million (1975 USD, $  USD). The hurricane killed 30 people, 20 of them were from drownings in shrimp boats.

Tropical Storm Priscilla 

A nearly stationary cloudy area developed a circulation on November 2. The depression drifted north for a while before turning to the west-northwest on November 3. It intensified into a tropical storm on November 4. Priscilla then began turning to the north. However, the system failed to re-curve, instead, the tropical storm turned generally westward. The tropical storm peaked in windspeed as a 65 mph (100 km/h) high-end storm on November 5. It then turned to the northwest on a heading nearly directly at Clarion Island, but it dissipated on November 7 about  short of landfall.

Other systems 
Besides the tropical storms and hurricanes this season, there were four additional tropical depressions that did not make a landfall anywhere. Tropical Cyclone Four formed on July 2 and dissipated the next day. It was the tropical cyclone to come closest to crossing 140°W and entering the Central Pacific Hurricane Center's area of responsibility this year. Tropical Cyclone Thirteen formed on September 12 and lasted four days. Tropical Cyclone Seventeen formed October 16 and dissipated a day later. Tropical Cyclone Nineteen, the penultimate system of the season, formed on November 1 and dissipated the next day.

Storm names 
These names were used for storms in 1975. It is the same list used in the 1971 season. This is the last time this list was used, as modern naming began in 1978. However, the names Agatha, Carlotta, Georgette, Hilary, Olivia, Priscilla, Terry, Veronica, and Winifred were added onto modern naming lists.

The central Pacific used names and numbers from the western Pacific's naming list. No names were used, as the one storm that formed in this area went unnamed.

See also 

 List of Pacific hurricanes
 Pacific hurricane season
 1975 Atlantic hurricane season
 1975 Pacific typhoon season
 1975 North Indian Ocean cyclone season
 Australian cyclone seasons: 1974–75, 1975–76
 South Pacific cyclone seasons: 1974–75, 1975–76
 South-West Indian Ocean cyclone seasons: 1974–75, 1975–76

References

External links 
 Eastern North Pacific Tropical Cyclones of 1975
 Unisys Weather archive for the Eastern Pacific, 1975

 
Pacific hurricane seasons
Articles which contain graphical timelines